Ann or Anne Hughes may refer to:

 Ann Harriet Hughes (1852–1910), Welsh language novelist
 Ann Hughes (politician) (born 1943), American politician from Illinois
 Ann Hughes (judoka) (born 1960), British judoka
 Anne Hughes (art patron) (born 1944), American gallery owner, restaurateur and patron of the arts
 Anne Meiman Hughes, American politician from Connecticut
 Anne Penny, née Hughes, British poet and translator
 The Diary of a Farmer's Wife 1796–1797, also known as Anne Hughes' Diary